The Adventures of François Villon was a series of four silent films released in 1914, directed by Charles Giblyn and featuring Murdock MacQuarrie as François Villon.  The four films are The Oubliette, The Higher Law, Monsieur Bluebeard, and The Ninety Black Boxes. The films were based on a series of short stories about François Villon written by George Bronson Howard.

The Oubliette

The Oubliette was released in August 1914 and features Murdock MacQuarrie and Lon Chaney. This film and By the Sun's Rays are two of Chaney's earliest surviving films.

Cast of The Oubliette
 Murdock MacQuarrie as François Villon
 Pauline Bush as Philippa de Annonay
 Lon Chaney as Chevalier Bertrand de la Payne
 Doc Crane as King Louis XI
 Chester Withey as Colin
 Millard K. Wilson as Chevalier Philip de Soisson
 Agnes Vernon

The Higher Law

The Higher Law was released in September 1914 and features Murdock MacQuarrie and Pauline Bush. Lon Chaney also has a role. The film is now considered to be lost.

Cast of The Higher Law
 Murdock MacQuarrie as François Villon
 Pauline Bush as Lady Eleyne
 Doc Crane as King Louis XI
 Lon Chaney as Sir Stephen
 Millard K. Wilson
 Chester Withey
 William B. Robbins

Monsieur Bluebeard
Monsieur Bluebeard was released in October 1914 in two reels.

The Ninety Black Boxes
The Ninety Black Boxes was released in November 1914 in two reels and features Murdock MacQuarrie and Doc Crane.

References

External links
 
 
 

1914 films
Silent American drama films
American silent short films
American black-and-white films
1914 drama films
1914 short films
Films directed by Charles Giblyn
Films about François Villon
Universal Pictures short films
Cultural depictions of François Villon
Cultural depictions of Louis XI of France
1910s American films